Kiester is a city in Faribault County, Minnesota, United States. The population was 501 at the 2010 census.

History
A post office called Kiester has been in operation since 1882. The city was named for county judge Jacob Armel Kiester.

Tornado

A tornado reportedly touched down in the city of Kiester on June 17, 2010. The tornado caused a large amount of destruction, and several homes were damaged. The tornado was later rated EF2 on the Enhanced Fujita Scale after damage assessment was completed.

Geography

Minnesota State Highway 22 and County Highway 2 are two of the main routes in the community.

Demographics

2010 census
As of the census of 2010, there were 501 people, 246 households, and 141 families residing in the city. The racial makeup of the city was 97.2% White, 0.4% Asian, 1.2% from other races, and 1.2% from two or more races. Hispanic or Latino of any race were 4.2% of the population.

There were 246 households, of which 20.3% had children under the age of 18 living with them, 42.3% were married couples living together, 9.3% had a female householder with no husband present, 5.7% had a male householder with no wife present, and 42.7% were non-families. 40.2% of all households were made up of individuals, and 20.7% had someone living alone who was 65 years of age or older. The average household size was 2.04 and the average family size was 2.67.

The median age in the city was 47.8 years. 17.2% of residents were under the age of 18; 8.6% were between the ages of 18 and 24; 18.8% were from 25 to 44; 29.4% were from 45 to 64; and 26.1% were 65 years of age or older. The gender makeup of the city was 51.5% male and 48.5% female.

In popular culture
On June 7, 2016, a Preparation H television commercial debuted that was filmed in Kiester.

References

External links
City of Kiester, MN – Official site
United South Central Schools site

Cities in Minnesota
Cities in Faribault County, Minnesota